The Ultimate Collection is a compilation album by British tenor Russell Watson released in 2006. The album was produced by British record producer, Simon Franglen.

Track listing
"Nella Fantasia"
"Caruso"
"Volare"
"The Prayer" (with Lulu)
"Il Gladiatore"
"You Raise Me Up"
"Miserere"
"Funiculi Funicula"
"O Sole Mio"
"Va Pensiero"
"You Are So Beautiful"
"Someone Like You" (with Faye Tozer)
"Is Nothing Sacred"
"Amore E Musica"
"Magia Sara"
"I Believe"
"Barcelona" (with Shaun Ryder)
"Nessun Dorma"
"I Have Nothing" (new track)
"Can't Help Falling in Love" (new track)

Charts

References

Russell Watson albums
2006 greatest hits albums